Daniel "Dani" González Benítez (born 7 April 1987) is a Spanish professional footballer who plays as a left midfielder for Arenas CD.

Club career
Born in Palma de Mallorca, Benítez began his career in the youth ranks of RCD Mallorca, but never appeared for the first team officially. He spent the 2007–08 season on loan to Pontevedra CF of Segunda División B, and the following campaign with Segunda División side Elche CF, also on loan, before being released.

In the summer of 2009, Benítez signed for Udinese Calcio in Italy; he and seven other players were immediately transferred to Granada CF as part of the clubs' partnership agreement. In his second season he scored a career-best ten goals in 36 games as the Andalusians achieved a second consecutive promotion, returning to La Liga after 35 years; his volatile character led to his receiving 13 yellow cards and two red.

Benítez failed to find the net during 2011–12, starting in 26 of his 30 league appearances. On 5 May 2012, after the 1–2 home loss against Real Madrid, he threw a bottle at the referee, Carlos Clos Gómez, which hit him in the face, for which he received a three-month suspension.

Upon his return to action, Benítez struggled heavily with injury problems. On 27 March 2014, it was announced he had failed a doping test in a match against Real Betis held the previous month, in which he was sent off after just 15 minutes on the pitch, cocaine being the illegal substance he had allegedly consumed.

On 9 January 2016, after nearly 20 months without a club, Benítez joined AD Alcorcón of the second division. He left on 28 June after making no official appearances, moving to third-tier Racing de Ferrol on a one-year contract one month later.

In July 2019, following a two-year spell in the Cypriot First Division with AEL Limassol, the 32-year-old Benítez returned to both his country and his native region by agreeing to a deal at amateurs UD Poblense.

References

External links

1987 births
Living people
Spanish footballers
Footballers from Palma de Mallorca
Association football midfielders
La Liga players
Segunda División players
Segunda División B players
Tercera División players
Tercera Federación players
RCD Mallorca B players
RCD Mallorca players
Pontevedra CF footballers
Elche CF players
Granada CF footballers
AD Alcorcón footballers
Racing de Ferrol footballers
UD Poblense players
Udinese Calcio players
Cypriot First Division players
AEL Limassol players
Primera Divisió players
UE Sant Julià players
Spanish expatriate footballers
Expatriate footballers in Cyprus
Expatriate footballers in Andorra
Spanish expatriate sportspeople in Cyprus
Spanish expatriate sportspeople in Andorra